
Year 584 (DLXXXIV) was a leap year starting on Saturday (link will display the full calendar) of the Julian calendar. The denomination 584 for this year has been used since the early medieval period, when the Anno Domini calendar era became the prevalent method in Europe for naming years.

Events 
 By place 

 Europe 
 September – King Chilperic I is stabbed to death while returning from a hunt near Chelles, after a 23-year reign over a territory extending from Aquitaine, to the northern seacoast of what later will be France.  His wife Fredegund, who has paid for his assassination, seizes his wealth, flees to Paris with her son Chlothar II, and persuades the nobles to accept him as legitimate heir while she serves as regent, continuing her power struggles with Guntram, king of Burgundy, and her sister Brunhilda, queen mother of Austrasia.
 The Lombards re-establish a unified monarchy after a 10-year interregnum (Rule of the Dukes). Threatened by a Frankish invasion that the dukes have provoked, they elect Authari (son of Cleph) as their king and give him the capital of Pavia (Northern Italy).
 The Visigoths under King Liuvigild capture the city of Seville, after a siege of nearly 2 years. His rebellious son Hermenegild seeks refuge in a church at Córdoba, but is arrested and banished to Tarragona. His wife Inguld flees with her son to Africa.
 The Exarchate of Ravenna is founded, and organised into a group of duchies, mainly coastal cities on the Italian Peninsula. The civil and military head of these Byzantine territories is the exarch (governor) in Ravenna. 
 The Slavs push south on the Balkan Peninsula – partly in conjunction with the Avars under their ruler (khagan) Bayan I – ravaging the cities Athens and Corinth, and threatening the Long Walls of Constantinople.
 King Eboric is deposed by his mother (second husband Andeca) who becomes the new ruler of the Kingdom of Galicia (Northern Spain) and the Suevi.
 Gundoald, illegitimate son of Chlothar I, tries to expend his territory from Brive-la-Gaillarde (Burgundy) and proclaims himself king (approximate date).

 Britain 
 Battle of Fethanleigh: King Ceawlin of Wessex is defeated by the Britons. He ravages the surrounding countryside in revenge (approximate date).

 Asia 
 Emperor Wéndi of the Sui Dynasty organises the Grand Canal. He builds ships for transportation and grain stores are located at strategic points.

Births 
 Amand, bishop and saint (approximate date)
 Chlothar II, king of the Franks (d. 629)
 Yang Zhao, prince of the Sui Dynasty (d. 606)

Deaths 
 April 15 – Ruadhán of Lorrha, Irish abbot and saint
 Chilperic I, king of Neustria (or Soissons)
 Deiniol, bishop of Bangor (Wales)
 Ingund, wife of Visigoth prince Hermenegild
 Maurus, Roman abbot and saint (b. 512)
 Approximate date – Bridei I, king of the Picts

References